The Order of Sir Galahad was an organization for Anglican and Episcopal boys and men, founded in Boston in 1896 by the Reverend Ernest Joseph Dennen. The Order's activities were structured around Galahad in Arthurian legend. The Order's summer camp was Camp O-AT-KA in Sebago, Maine.

External links 
The Manual for Leaders of the Order of Sir Galahad (1921)
Short History of the Order of Sir Galahad at St. Mark’s Church, Frankford (1932)
Camp O-AT-KA website

Religious organizations established in 1896
1896 establishments in Massachusetts
Episcopal Church (United States)